Shoulder sleeve insignia (SSI) are cloth emblems worn on the shoulders of US Army uniforms to identify the primary headquarters to which a soldier is assigned.

Note: several insignia are of older formations.

Airborne Corps

Armored Corps

Army Corps

See also 
 Field Army Insignia of the United States Army
 Division insignia of the United States Army
 Brigade insignia of the United States Army
 Miscellaneous shoulder sleeve insignia of the United States Army

References

External links 
 World War I Insignia

United States Army lists
Heraldry of the United States Army